The 2012 Incarnate Word Cardinals football team represented the University of the Incarnate Word in the 2012 NCAA Division II football season. This was be the Cardinals' final season in the Lone Star Conference as they began the transition to the Football Championship Subdivision (FCS) in 2013. Home games were played at Gayle and Tom Benson Stadium. They finished the season 2–9, 1–7 in Lone Star play to finish in a tie for eighth place.

Previous season
The Cardinals finished the 2011 season with a record of 2–8, 2–6 in Lone Star Conference play.

Schedule

TV and radio
All Incarnate Word games were broadcast on KKYX 680 AM with the voices of Gabe Farias and Shawn Morris. KKYX's broadcasts were available at their website. KUIW Radio produced a student media broadcast every week, that is available online, and they provided streaming of all non-televised home games were shown via UIW TV.

References

Incarnate Word
Incarnate Word Cardinals football seasons
Incarnate Word Cardinals football